Ginrei or ShindaiSat was a 400x400x450mm cube-like microsatellite intended to text experimental visible light communication. The satellite is made in Shinshu University (Japan). The ground station was completed by 18 March 2014 and attempts to communicate with satellite have started the same day. 2-way optical communication with ground station is planned. Also, advanced attitude control using visible light communication is planned as well.

Mission results
The Ginrei optical signals were received 10 seconds per pass, averaged over 56 passes over the control station. The narrow beam and infrequent operation of optical transmitter have resulted in severe disappointment in amateur optical tracking community.

See also

 2014 in spaceflight
 Niwaka

References

External links
 GinRei Gunter`s space page
 Communication diagram of Ginrei

Spacecraft launched in 2014
Spacecraft which reentered in 2014
2014 in Japan
Satellites of Japan